Jesús Blanco (born 18 November 1946) is an Argentine former wrestler who competed in the 1972 Summer Olympics.

References

External links
 

1946 births
Living people
Olympic wrestlers of Argentina
Wrestlers at the 1972 Summer Olympics
Argentine male sport wrestlers